Española  is a city primarily in Rio Arriba County, New Mexico, United States. A portion of the central and eastern section of the city is in Santa Fe County. Founded as a railroad village some distance from the old Indian town of San Juan de los Caballeros (now renamed Ohkay Owingeh), it was named Española and officially incorporated in 1925. It has been called the first capital city in the United States. At the time of the 2010 census, the city had a total population of 10,495. Española is within the Albuquerque–Santa Fe–Las Vegas combined statistical area.

History

Etymology

Española was referred to as La Vega de los Vigiles ('the Vigils' Meadow') before the presence of railroads. La Española means 'Spanish woman', and folk history attributes the name to railroad construction workers who named the area after a woman who worked in a small restaurant in the area. In fact the name is a shortened form of Plaza Española ('Spanish town'), which likely was to differentiate it from the Tewa pueblo just to the south.

Spanish settlement
Tewa people have lived in the area since the 13th century. They built towns in the area, now called 'pueblos', four of which still exist: Ohkay Owingeh, Pojoaque, Santa Clara and San Ildefonso.

The upper reaches of the Rio Grande region was explored by the Spanish in 1540. Don Juan de Oñate was the first to bring settlers here in 1598. His group stayed at Ohkay Owingeh for a time (calling the Tewa town San Juan de los Caballeros), before settling in an abandoned Tewa village which he renamed San Gabriel. San Gabriel, close to modern Española, can thus be seen as the first capital city founded by people of European racial descent in what is now the United States.

Oñate arrived in the Española area on July 11, 1598, at the confluence of the Chama River and the Rio Grande, where he established a camp at a place then called Yunque-Yunque.

Almost a century later, near the same region, Don Diego de Vargas established his villa at Santa Cruz.

Railroad era

Prior to the arrival from Antonito, Colorado of the narrow gauge Denver and Rio Grande Railroad in 1880, the hamlet on the west-side of the Rio Grande was known as La Vega de los Vigiles in reference to the Vigil family who initially settled that area. The earliest document found indicates that La Vegas de los Vigiles had been populated by 1751, over 100 years before the railroad's arrival. With the coming of the railroad the name of the hamlet was changed to Española. Until 1886, when it was extended to Santa Fe, Española was the terminus of the line. The Española station included an engine facility along with a roundhouse and turntable so it could service the locomotives. The facilities were built but torn down or no longer in use after six years; plans for the town had changed. Later popularly known as the "Chili Line", this was part of an ambitious but unsuccessful proposal to connect Denver with Mexico City. 

The route extended into what today is the downtown Española area, and the railroad began selling lots in the area. Anglo merchants, mountain men, and settlers slowly filtered into Española. Frank Bond and his brother George, who were Canadian emigrants, would later arrive in the city. Together they established the state's largest mercantile and a multi–million dollar wool empire. With them came economic growth and prominence. Española was the headquarters for all the Bond family interests which included over 12 businesses across New Mexico.

Frank R. Frankenburger, a business man born in Fort Scott, Kansas, was the first "elected" mayor; he was elected in 1923. The first mayor who was chosen in "popularity" was Frank Bond, in 1907. In 1925 Española was incorporated as a city. As the population rose, there was a high demand for public education in the city. Española High School was established; it would be the largest school in the area for decades. The first high school in the area, however, was Santa Cruz High School. Two miles away from downtown Española, it opened in 1906 in the historic Santa Cruz area. Neither high school operates after a merger of school districts in 1975.

The importance of the railroad began to lessen as minimal passenger traffic and low shipments forced the railroad to close in 1941, with the tracks removed the following year. Many locals would become unemployed and would follow the railroad to Santa Fe, Albuquerque and central Colorado for jobs. Española's population would fall dramatically and many homes in the downtown became abandoned. Most of the locals who remained would turn to farming as a way of life. Many people saw Española as another failed railroad town. The city removed the railroad tracks and the train depot in the 1960s, and the railroads completely vanished.

Post-railroad

With the beginnings of Manhattan Project in nearby Los Alamos, many locals eventually found jobs at the Los Alamos National Laboratory (LANL). As much as nearly 9% of Española's population have been employed at LANL.

In the 1980s, many historical buildings and homes of historical significance were torn down for urban renewal. Española followed many other New Mexico cities in this trend, but in Española, it failed. More modern business began to move into town, but the growth of Española had now expanded east across the Rio Grande. Although several buildings of historical significance remain in downtown Española, many are unused or abandoned. Strip malls became visible in Española, the first being the 'Big Rock shopping center', founded by oil tycoon Roy Honstein.

In the 1990s, a controversial plan to build a "plaza" and mission church where many historic buildings once stood was up for consideration. The city agreed to the plan, and locals supported the plaza. Although a plaza never existed in Española before the railroads, it was built to pay tribute to the Spanish culture in the area.

Recent history

On September 18, 2008, Barack Obama, then a candidate for president, visited Española for a rally at the city's New Plaza in the Main Street district.

Geography
Española is located at  (36.001884, -106.064587).

It is in a valley nestled between the Jemez and Sangre de Cristo mountain ranges, and the meeting point of three rivers, the Rio Grande, the Rio Chama, and the Rio Santa Cruz.

Climate
Española has a borderline cool semi-arid climate (Köppen BSk)/cool desert climate (BWk). The main Española weather station is hotter and drier than nearby cities due to relatively lower altitude, lying over  lower than Taos or county seat Tierra Amarilla.

Air quality

According to the 2011 annual report by the American Lung Association, the Santa Fe–Española CSA (metropolitan area) has the cleanest ozone layer in the country (ranked #1), cleanest area in the country for 24-hour particle pollution (ranked #1) and cleanest area in the country for annual particle pollution (ranked #2).

Demographics

2000 census

At the census of 2000, there were 9,688 people, 5,751 households, and 4,569 families residing in the city. The population density was 1,155.4 people per square mile (446.4/km). There were 5,107 housing units at an average density of 189.2/square kilometer (489.8/square mile). The racial makeup of the city was 67.55% White, 0.58% African American, 2.86% Native American, 0.14% Asian, 0.06% Pacific Islander, 25.56% from other races, and 3.25% from two or more races. 84.38% of the population were Hispanic or Latino of any race.

There were 5,751 households, of which 35.6% had children under the age of eighteen living with them, 42.5% were married couples living together, 18.5% had a female householder with no husband present, and 31.5% were non-families. 26.2% of all households were made up of single individuals, and 9.7% had someone living alone who was sixty-five years of age or older. The average household size was 2.56 and the average family size was 3.08.

In the city, the population was spread out, with 27.8% under the age of 18, 9.7% from 18 to 24, 28.1% from 25 to 44, 22.1% from 45 to 64, and 12.3% who were 65 years of age or older. The median age was thirty-four years. For every 100 females there were 95.3 males. For every 100 females aged eighteen and over, there were 94.6 males.

The median income for a household in the city was $27,144, and the median income for a family was $32,255. Males had a median income of $25,558 versus $23,177 for females. The per capita income for the city was $14,303. 21.6% of the population and 16.5% of families were below the poverty line. Out of the total population, 28.4% of those under the age of eighteen and 15.1% of those sixty-five and older were living below the poverty line.

2010 census

As of the census of 2010, there were 10,224 residing in the city.

The racial makeup of the city was:
8.8% White (alone)
0.3% Black or African American
2.3% Native American
1.0% Asian
0.1% from other races
0.4% Multiracial (two or more races)
87.1% of the population were Hispanics or Latinos (of any race)

Economy

The Los Alamos National Laboratory is the largest employer in Española; it accounts for over 12% employment of residents. The education sector is the second largest employer, the Española Public Schools is the 16th largest school district in New Mexico. Recently, Northern New Mexico College has expanded its degree programs and made massive improvements to its campus, adding a new library and a new School of Education. Larger local businesses include Akal Securities Inc, a security company that employees over 500 people.

Española has seen much commercial development on Riverside Drive, the city's secondary main road. Retail and eatery chains such as Lowe's, Chili's and GameStop are anchors of a massive shopping square located next to Wal-Mart which came into the city in 1999. CVS/Pharmacy and Petsense also added locations in Española.

Plaza De Española

The fountain at Plaza de Española was designed as a replica of the Alhambra. The plaza is home to the Convent Mission, administered by the Episcopal Church.

Telecommunications 

Satview Broadband, headquartered in Reno, is the local cable television company. Due to a legal dispute with Jemez Mountains Electric Cooperative, Satview Broadband has suspended services in Española as of March 2016. The city is served by several satellite TV services and is served by Windstream Communications for telecom and broadband service.

Festivals and activities

Española's restaurants and convenience stores are popular with travelers between Santa Fe and northern communities, as well as with local people. The local fiestas are held in the summer to commemorate the Spanish colonization and introduction of Christian faith to the area. The fiestas include live New Mexico and/or country music, vendors and parades.

There are many locations near Española that provide for outdoor activity such as hiking, biking, and river sports like rafting and kayaking. Nearby winter sports include skiing (downhill and cross-country) and snowboarding.

Parks and recreation

Recreational facilities
 Penny Roybal Garcia (Ranchitos) Aquatic Center
 Richard L. Lucero Recreation Center

Major community parks
 Plaza de Española Park
 Vietnam Veteran's Memorial Park
 Ranchitos Park
 Valdez Park (dedicated in memory of Española native Phil Valdez)

Government

The city of Española is run by a mayor–council government system under Strong-mayor form. The mayor and eight-member city councilors from their respected districts are elected to a four-year term, elections are constant every two years, with no term limits. The mayor appoints a city manager who supervises department heads, prepares the budget, and coordinates departments.

Every two years during the organizational meeting, one council member is elected by a majority in the council to serve as mayor pro–tem, usually a member from the party that is in control of the council.

Elected officials

List of mayors

{| class="wikitable collapsible collapsed"
|+
! colspan=2 style="text-align:center;" bgcolor=""|Mayors of Española
|-
! Elected Mayor
! Party Registration
! Years served
|- 
|F.R. Frankenburger
| Republican
|1925–1928
|- 
|Tobias Espinosa, M.D.
| Republican
|1928–1932
|- 
|Diego Salazar
| Republican
|1932–1948
|- 
|John Block, Jr.
| Democrat
|1948–1952
|- 
|Joe E. Roybal
| Democrat
|1952–1958
|- 
|Cipriano Vigil
| Democrat
|1958–1966
|- 
|Epimenio Vigil
| Democrat
|1966–1968
|- 
|Richard Lucero
| Democrat
|1968–1974
|- 
|Santiago V. Martinez
| Republican
|1974–1981*
|- 
| Alex R. Gallegos, Interim
| Democrat
|1981-1982
|- 
|Consuelo S. Thompson
| Democrat
|1982–1986
|- 
|Richard Lucero
| Democrat
|1986–1994
|-
|Ross Chavez
| Democrat
|1994–1998
|- 
|Richard Lucero
| Democrat
|1998–2006
|- 
|Joseph Maestas
| Democrat
|2006–2010
|- 
|Alice A. Lucero
| Democrat
|2010–2018
|- 
| Javier E. Sánchez
| Republican
|2018–2022
|- 
| John Ramon Vigil
| Democrat
|2022-present
|}
*Denotes Resignation

Education

Public schools

The City of Española is a part of the Española Public Schools district, with six of its 14 schools being located within the city.
 Secondary schools
Española Valley High School
Carlos F. Vigil Middle School

Elementary schools
Eutimio Tim Salazar III "Fairview" Elementary
James H. Rodriguez "Española" Elementary
Tony E. Quintana "Sombrillo" Elementary

Kindergartens
Los Niños Kindergarten Center

Charter and tribal schools
McCurdy Charter School K-12
La Tierra Montesori School of the Arts and Sciences
Carinos de los Ninos Charter School

There is a Bureau of Indian Education (BIE)-affiliated tribal elementary school, Kha'p'o Community School, that has an Espanola address, though the school is actually in Santa Clara Pueblo.

Private schools
Holy Cross Catholic School (Roman Catholic Archdiocese of Santa Fe)
Victory Faith Christian Academy

College
Northern New Mexico College

Library
Española Public Library is located inside the Richard Lucero Center at 313 North Paseo De Oñate. Its collection is about 50,000 items.

Notable people
 Jack Aeby, environmental physicist
Eppie Archuleta, weaver and textile artist
Frank Bond, Canadian businessman
Jacobo de la Serna, ceramic artist
Sandra Dodd, unschooling advocate
Kenneth John Gonzales, attorney and judge
Robert B. Hall, geographer
Leo Jaramillo, member of the New Mexico Senate
Joseph Maestas, member of the New Mexico Public Regulation Commission
Joe Mondragon, jazz musician
Hari Jiwan Singh Khalsa, Sikh leader
Patricia D. Lopez, computer scientist
Richard Lucero, longest-serving mayor of Española
Roger Montoya, humanitarian, artist, former gymnast, and politician
Members of The Movin' Morfomen
Nora Naranjo Morse, artist and poet
Satya Rhodes-Conway, politician in Madison, Wisconsin
Raemer Schreiber, physicist
Harbhajan Singh Khalsa, founder of the 3HO movement, moved to Española
 Debbie Rodella, New Mexico state legislator, was born in Española.
 Scott Tipton, Member of the U.S. House of Representatives from Colorado's 3rd district, was born in Española.

See also

List of municipalities in New Mexico

References

External links

City website
Chamber of Commerce

 
Cities in Rio Arriba County, New Mexico
Cities in Santa Fe County, New Mexico
Cities in New Mexico
Micropolitan areas of New Mexico
Populated places established in 1598
1598 establishments in New Spain
New Mexico populated places on the Rio Grande